Edmund Taylor (30 December 1853 – 25 December 1936) was an English cricketer. He played for Gloucestershire between 1876 and 1886.

References

1853 births
1936 deaths
English cricketers
Gloucestershire cricketers
Cricketers from Bristol